Dorothy Hey (1931 – 9 September 2015) was a British gymnast. She competed in the women's artistic team all-around at the 1948 Summer Olympics.

References

External links
 

1931 births
2015 deaths
British female artistic gymnasts
Olympic gymnasts of Great Britain
Gymnasts at the 1948 Summer Olympics
Sportspeople from Bradford
20th-century British women